Canuti is an Italian surname. Notable people with the surname include:

Domenico Maria Canuti (1620–1660), Italian painter
Federico Canuti (born 1985), Italian cyclist
Nazzareno Canuti (born 1956), Italian footballer
 

Italian-language surnames